Stig Erik Lindberg (3 July 1931 – 11 October 2010) was a Swedish race walker. He competed in the 20 km and 50 km events at the 1968 Summer Olympics, and placed 15th and 5th, respectively.

References

1931 births
2010 deaths
Athletes (track and field) at the 1968 Summer Olympics
Olympic athletes of Sweden
Swedish male racewalkers
20th-century Swedish people
21st-century Swedish people